The 1975 Duke Blue Devils football team represented Duke University during the 1975 NCAA Division I football season.

Schedule

References

Duke
Duke Blue Devils football seasons
Duke Blue Devils football